Sheykh Abueshaq Kazeruni (Persian:شیخ ابواسحاق کازرونی), was a Persian mystic who was born in Kazerun.

Sources

People from Kazerun
Year of birth missing
Year of death missing
10th-century Iranian people
Iranian Muslim mystics